The 1999 Vanderbilt Commodores football team represented Vanderbilt University in the 1999 NCAA Division I FBS football season.  The team played their home games at Vanderbilt Stadium in Nashville, Tennessee.

Schedule

Previous season
Vanderbilt came into the 1998 season unranked and had a streak of 14 losing seasons. 1998 was no better as Vanderbilt finished the season with a 2–9 record, 1–7 in the SEC. The season began with a 42–0 loss at Mississippi State.   The next week fared no better for the Commodores as they were beaten by Alabama, 32–7.  In week three, Vanderbilt had its home opener, but to no avail, as the Commodores fell to Ole Miss, 30–6, and in week four, Vanderbilt lost to TCU, 19–16 in overtime.

The next game for the Commodores was a loss to Western Michigan at home, 27–23.  Vanderbilt put themselves out of bowl contention with a 31–6 loss to Georgia.  The week following, Vanderbilt got their first win, a 17–14 win over South Carolina.  The next game also ended with a Vandy victory, a 36–33 overtime win over Duke. Victory was short-lived, however, as the Dores lost their final three games.  A 45–13 loss to Florida started the gloomy November, followed by a loss 55–17 to Kentucky, and a 41–0 loss to instate rival Tennessee.

Roster

References

Vanderbilt
Vanderbilt Commodores football seasons
Vanderbilt Commodores football